Statistics of Empress's Cup in the 1984 season.

Overview
It was contested by 16 teams, and Shimizudaihachi SC won the championship.

Results

1st Round
Takatsuki FC 9-0 Miss Kick Kanazawa
Yonan SC 4-1 Shizuoka Koki SC
Kobe FC 5-0 Molten Habatake
Aosaki LSC 0-9 Yomiuri SC Beleza
Nishiyama Club 2-0 Miyagi Hirose High School
Shimizu FC Mama 0-3 FC Jinnan
FC Kodaira 4-0 Ryuhoku Club
Uwajima Minami High School 0-12 Shimizudaihachi SC

Quarterfinals
Takatsuki FC 0-0 (pen 5–4) Yonan SC
Kobe FC 0-1 Yomiuri SC Beleza
Nishiyama Club 0-0 (pen 1–2) FC Jinnan
FC Kodaira 0-4 Shimizudaihachi SC

Semifinals
Takatsuki FC 1-1 (pen 3–1) Yomiuri SC Beleza
FC Jinnan 0-3 Shimizudaihachi SC

Final
Takatsuki FC 0-4 Shimizudaihachi SC
Shimizudaihachi SC won the championship.

References

Empress's Cup
1984 in Japanese women's football